Robin Haeyoun Cheong (born 16 December 1988 in Republic of Korea) is a New Zealand taekwondo athlete, who competed in the Women's 57 kg class at the 2008 Summer Olympics held in Beijing, China reaching quarter finals and eventually ranked 7th. She won gold medal that same year in the Beijing Olympic Selection competition.

Cheong is a 2010 SPARC Taekwondo High Performance Project recipient, allowing her to compete internationally as a preparation for the forthcoming 2012 London Olympic Games.

In 2008, she received the most prestigious University award - the New Zealand University Blue.

Cheong is a resident of Pinehill, Auckland. She is a member of Sejong Taekwondo club and is coached by Grandmaster Jin Keun Oh.

She qualified for the 2012 Summer Olympics, but was knocked out in the first round by Hedaya Malak.

Achievements
Other Robin's competition results include:
2006 Oceania Taekwondo Championships - gold medal
2007 Oceania Olympic Qualification Championships - gold medal
2010 Canada Open Championships, Montreal, Canada - silver medal (World Taekwondo Federation division)
2010 Canada Open Championships, Montreal, Canada - gold medal (Olympic division)
2010 International Club Open, Yeongcheon, Republic of Korea - gold medal (Olympic division)
2010 4th Oceania Taekwondo Union Championships, Noumea, New Caledonia - silver medal
2011 Olympic Games Qualification Tournament, Noumea, New Caledonia - Gold Medal

References

Living people
New Zealand female taekwondo practitioners
Olympic taekwondo practitioners of New Zealand
Taekwondo practitioners at the 2008 Summer Olympics
Taekwondo practitioners at the 2012 Summer Olympics
1988 births
South Korean emigrants to New Zealand
New Zealand people of Korean descent